Niesgrau is a municipality in the district of Schleswig-Flensburg, in Schleswig-Holstein, northern Germany near the Danish border.

References

Municipalities in Schleswig-Holstein
Schleswig-Flensburg